Tennessee's 16th Senate district is one of 33 districts in the Tennessee Senate. It has been represented by Republican Janice Bowling since 2012, succeeding Democrat Eric Stewart.

Geography
District 16 is based in the rural areas to the west of Chattanooga, covering all of Coffee, Franklin, Grundy, Marion, Sequatchie, Van Buren, and Warren Counties. Communities in the district include Tullahoma, Manchester, McMinnville, Winchester, Dunlap, Jasper, South Pittsburg, Gruetli-Laager, and Spencer.

The district overlaps with Tennessee's 4th and 6th congressional districts, and with the 25th, 31st, 39th, 43rd, 47th, and 92nd districts of the Tennessee House of Representatives. It borders the states of Georgia and Alabama.

Recent election results
Tennessee senators are elected to staggered four-year terms, with odd-numbered districts conducting elections in midterm years and even-numbered districts conducting elections in years of presidential elections.

2020

2016

2012

Federal and statewide results in District 16

References

16
Coffee County, Tennessee
Franklin County, Tennessee
Grundy County, Tennessee
Marion County, Tennessee
Sequatchie County, Tennessee
Van Buren County, Tennessee
Warren County, Tennessee